Crenshaw Boulevard is a north-south thoroughfare in Los Angeles, California, that runs through Crenshaw and other neighborhoods along a 23-mile (37.76 km) route in the west-central part of the city.

The street extends between Wilshire Boulevard in Mid-Wilshire, Los Angeles, on the north and Rolling Hills, on the south. Crenshaw marks the eastern boundaries of Torrance, and Hawthorne and the western border of Gardena.

The commercial corridor in the Hyde Park neighborhood is known as "the heart of African American commerce in Los Angeles".

History
Crenshaw Boulevard was named after banker and Los Angeles real estate developer George Lafayette Crenshaw who also developed the affluent Lafayette Square.

The southern end of Crenshaw Boulevard was at Adams Street until 1916-1918, when the road was extended between Adams on the north and Slauson Avenue on the south. The extension saved three miles in travel over the nearest through road (Western Avenue) and five miles over the nearest paved road (Vermont Avenue).

The street became a major transportation route with tracks for the 5 Line streetcar line in the median between Leimert Boulevard on the north close to Florence Ave on the south. With the abandonment of the streetcar system in the 1950s, the railway median was narrowed, the driving lanes improved and the street reconfigured for automobiles, buses and trucks.

Revitalization project
Many local residents were disappointed that 71 mature street-line trees were cut down in 2012 to make way for the Space Shuttle Endeavour to be moved from LAX to the California Science Center in nearby Exposition Park. The construction of the K Line required the removal of additional trees in 2014. City officials promised that more trees would be planted than were removed. The improvements will include bike lanes, wider sidewalks, new Metro bus stops, LED traffic lights and street lights. The revitalization was coordinated with the construction of Destination Crenshaw. A  portion of Crenshaw Boulevard in the Hyde Park and Leimert Park neighborhoods will become an open-air museum dedicated to preserving the history and culture of African Americans. The project includes pocket parks, outdoor sculptures, murals, street furniture, and landscaping.

Transportation

Metro Local
Metro Local lines 40 and 210, and Torrance Transit line 10 serve Crenshaw Boulevard; Metro line 210 run through the majority of Crenshaw Boulevard to Artesia Boulevard, Metro line 40 from Crenshaw District to Hyde Park, and Torrance Transit line 10 south of Artesia Boulevard. The Metro C Line serves the Crenshaw station on Crenshaw Boulevard underneath Interstate 105, while the Metro E and K Lines serves Expo/Crenshaw  station at the intersection with Exposition Boulevard. 

In the Crenshaw district, Crenshaw Boulevard and Baldwin Hills Crenshaw Plaza are served primarily by LADOT trolleys, buses and a light rail subway line Los Angeles County Metropolitan Transportation Authority bus lines that are:
 Metro Local Line 40 - South Bay Galleria - Patsaouras Transit Plaza via Martin Luther King Boulevard and Hawthorne Boulevard 
 Metro Local Line 210 - South Bay Galleria - Hollywood/Vine B Line Station via Crenshaw Boulevard, Rossmore Avenue, and Vine Street

Crenshaw Boulevard is also briefly served in the Crenshaw district by the following LACMTA lines:
 Metro Local Line 102 - LAX City Bus Center to Huntington Park via La Tijera Boulevard, Stocker Street, Exposition Boulevard and Jefferson Boulevard
 Metro Local Line 105  - West Hollywood - Vernon via La Cienega Boulevard, Barack Obama Boulevard and Vernon Avenue

Additionally, the Metro K Line runs along the Crenshaw Boulevard alignment from the E Line to 67th Street, serving three more additional stations:
 Martin Luther King Jr
 Leimert Park
 Hyde Park

LADOT
Crenshaw Boulevard is served by these LADOT Dash lines:
 LADOT Crenshaw - Stocker and Coliseum via La Brea
 LADOT Leimert Park/Slauson - Down King Boulevard via Crenshaw Blvd
 LADOT Midtown - Down Crenshaw Blvd

Notable landmarks
 The intersection of Slauson Avenue and Crenshaw Boulevard was named Ermias  “Nipsey Hussle” Asghedom Square in April 2019 to honor him and his contributions to the neighborhood.
 Baldwin Hills Crenshaw Plaza
 Crenshaw High School
 Destination Crenshaw, 1.3-mile-long (2.1 km) open-air museum of African American history and culture
The Holiday Bowl was a bowling alley and café known for being a center of ethnic diversity during the 1960s and 1970s. It featured a sushi bar known as the Sakiba Lounge with live musical acts with a Modernist Googie architecture style. It is City of Los Angeles Historic Cultural Monument #688.
 SpaceX Headquarters

References

External links 

Crenshaw, Los Angeles
Streets in Los Angeles
Boulevards in the United States
Streets in Los Angeles County, California
Economy of Los Angeles
Central Los Angeles
Mid-City, Los Angeles
South Los Angeles